Raphipeza is a genus of moths in the family Lasiocampidae. The genus was erected by Arthur Gardiner Butler in 1880.

Species
Raphipeza echinata Saalmüller, 1879
Raphipeza orientalis Viette, 1962
Raphipeza perineti Viette, 1962
Raphipeza pratti Viette, 1962
Raphipeza turbata Butler, 1879

References

Lasiocampidae